The 1790 United States elections were the first U.S. midterm elections. They occurred in the middle of President George Washington's first term, and determined the members of the 2nd United States Congress. Formal political parties did not exist, but Congress was broadly divided between a faction supporting the policies of the Washington administration and a faction opposed to those policies. Despite modest gains for the anti-administration faction, the pro-administration faction retained control of both houses of Congress. Vermont and Kentucky joined the union during the 2nd Congress.

In the House, neither faction made significant gains or losses, and the pro-administration faction retained control of the chamber.

In the Senate, the anti-administration faction picked up a moderate number of seats, but the pro-administration faction narrowly retained control of the chamber.

See also
1790–91 United States House of Representatives elections
1790–91 United States Senate elections

References

1790 elections in the United States
1790
United States midterm elections